Pink Lily is a rural locality in the Rockhampton Region, Queensland, Australia. In the  Pink Lily had a population of 231 people. The proposed Rockhampton Ring Road will pass through Pink Lily.

History 
The locality takes its name from the Pink Lily railway station, named by the Queensland Railways Department on 22 August 1916, taking the name from the Pink Lily Lagoon.

Pink Lily Lagoon State School opened on 9 September 1872 and closed on 30 April 1971.

Pink Lily Primitive Methodist Church opened on Friday 10 December 1886.

In the  Pink Lily had a population of 231 people.

References 

Suburbs of Rockhampton Region
Localities in Queensland